Elton Reservoir, also known as Warth Fold, is a proposed tram stop on the Bury Line of Greater Manchester's Metrolink light rail system. It is to be located between Bury Interchange and Radcliffe Metrolink station, southeast of Elton Reservoir and south of Bury town centre.

Background
The proposal is identified in the Greater Manchester Spatial Framework to serve new housing development around Elton Reservoir.

References

Proposed Manchester Metrolink tram stops